Santa Maria dei Servi may refer to:

 Santa Maria dei Servi, Bologna
 Santa Maria dei Servi (Siena)
 Santa Maria dei Servi, Padua
 Santa Maria dei Servi, Sansepolcro
 Santa Maria dei Servi, Vicenza